DYYR (91.1 FM), broadcasting as 91.1 Yes The Best, is a radio station owned by Manila Broadcasting Company and operated by JME Broadcast Resources. Its studio and transmitter are located in Brgy. Balabag, Malay, Aklan.

Established in 1997, it is the pioneer radio station in Boracay. It was initially under the Radyo Natin network until 1999, when it rebranded as Yes The Best.

References

Radio stations in Boracay
Radio stations established in 1997